{{DISPLAYTITLE:D-Deprenyl}}

-Deprenyl, also known as or dextro-N-propargyl-N-methylamphetamine, is an MAO-B inhibitor that metabolizes into -amphetamine and -methamphetamine and is therefore also a norepinephrine–dopamine releasing agent. It is the opposite enantiomer of -deprenyl (selegiline).

-Deprenyl, also an MAO-B inhibitor, metabolizes to -amphetamine and -methamphetamine, which are both norepinephrine releasing agents. In contrast, -deprenyl additionally has dopaminergic effects and has been found to be reinforcing in scientific research, whereas -deprenyl is not known to have any appreciable psychological reinforcement.

In addition to its actions as an MAO-B inhibitor and NDRA, -deprenyl has been found to bind with high affinity to the σ1 receptor (Ki = 79 nM) similarly to various other amphetamine derivatives. Its -isomer, selegiline, binds with 3.5-fold lower affinity in comparison.

See also
 Clorgiline
 Tranylcypromine

References

Propargyl compounds
Enantiopure drugs
Monoamine oxidase inhibitors
Norepinephrine-dopamine releasing agents
Phenethylamines
Prodrugs
Sigma receptor ligands